Auricular veins can refer to:
 Anterior auricular veins (venae auriculares anteriores)
 Posterior auricular vein (Vena auricularis posterior)